2-(1-Hexyloxyethyl)-2-devinyl pyropheophorbide-a (HPPH) is a photosensitiser chemical that is used in photodynamic therapy.

It is being developed under the brand name Photochlor.

Clinical trials
A phase I/II clinical trial started in 1997 for esophageal cancer.

A phase II trial for non-small cell lung cancer is due to run from 2007 to 2011.

References

External links
 Clinical trials of HPPH

Tetrapyrroles